This article lists events from the year 2016 in Montenegro.

Incumbents
 President: Filip Vujanović
 Prime Minister: Milo Đukanović (until 28 November); Duško Marković

Events
Ongoing – the 2015–16 political crisis
5-21 August – Montenegro at the 2016 Summer Olympics: 34 competitors in 7 sports. The Montenegrin water polo team reached the semifinals and ended in 4th place.
16 October – Montenegrin parliamentary election, 2016
28 November – Duško Marković took over as prime minister

Deaths

3 June – Sreten Asanović, writer (b. 1931).

8 September – Dragiša Pešić, politician (b. 1954).

References

Links

 
Years of the 21st century in Montenegro
Montenegro
Montenegro
2010s in Montenegro